Eilema debilissima is a moth of the subfamily Arctiinae. It was described by Sergius G. Kiriakoff in 1958. It is found in Kenya and Uganda.

References

debilissima
Moths described in 1958
Moths of Africa